is a former Japanese football player and manager.

Playing career
Nakata was born in Iga on April 19, 1973. He played for many clubs as defensive position, defender and defensive midfielder. After graduating from high school, he joined Yokohama Flügels in 1992. The club won the champions 1993 Emperor's Cup and 1994–95 Asian Cup Winners' Cup. In 1996, he moved to J1 League club, Avispa Fukuoka and played in 2 seasons. In 1998, he moved to Japan Football League club Oita Trinity (later Oita Trinita). In October 1998, he moved to JEF United Ichihara. He played many matches until 2000. In 2001, he played for Oita Trinita again. In 2002, he moved to J1 League club, Vegalta Sendai, however he could hardly play in the matches due to injury. In 2004, he moved to Ventforet Kofu.

Coaching career
In 2019, Nakata signed with J2 League club Kyoto Sanga FC.

Club statistics

Managerial statistics
Update; December 31, 2018

References

External links

1973 births
Living people
Association football people from Mie Prefecture
Japanese footballers
J1 League players
J2 League players
Japan Football League (1992–1998) players
Yokohama Flügels players
Avispa Fukuoka players
Oita Trinita players
JEF United Chiba players
Vegalta Sendai players
Ventforet Kofu players
Japanese football managers
J2 League managers
Kyoto Sanga FC managers
Association football defenders